Samantha Louise Taylor-Johnson OBE (née Taylor-Wood; 4 March 1967) is a British film director, artist and photograher. Her directorial feature film debut was 2009's Nowhere Boy, a film based on the childhood experiences of The Beatles songwriter and singer John Lennon. She is one of a group of artists known as the Young British Artists.

Early life
Samantha Taylor-Wood was born in Croydon, London. Her father, David, left the family when she was nine. Her mother, Geraldine, is a yoga teacher and astrologist. She has a younger sister, Ashley, and a maternal half-brother, Kristian.

Taylor-Johnson grew up near Streatham Common in south London until her parents' divorce. The family then moved into an old schoolhouse in Jarvis Brook in East Sussex, and Samantha went to Beacon Community College. She later attended Goldsmiths, University of London.

Career

Fine art

Taylor-Johnson began exhibiting fine-art photography in the early 1990s. One collaboration with Henry Bond, titled 26 October 1993, featured Bond and Taylor-Wood reprising the roles of Yoko Ono and John Lennon in a pastiche of the photo-portrait made by photographer Annie Leibovitz—a few hours before Lennon was assassinated, in 1980.

In 1994, she exhibited a multi-screen video work titled Killing Time, in which four people mimed to an opera score. From that point multi-screen video works became the main focus of Taylor-Johnson's work. Beginning with the video works Travesty of a Mockery and Pent-Up in 1996. One of Taylor-Johnson's first United Kingdom solo shows was held at the Chisenhale Gallery, east London, in September–October 1996. Taylor-Johnson was nominated for the annual Turner Prize in 1998, but lost out to the painter Chris Ofili. She won the Illy Café Prize for Most Promising Young Artist at the 1997 Venice Biennale.

In 2000, Taylor-Johnson created a wraparound photomural around scaffolding of the London department store Selfridges while it was being restored; the mural featured 21 cultural icons including Elton John, musician Alex James, and actors Richard E. Grant and Ray Winstone. The poses of the figures referenced famous works of art from the past and recent movies.

In 2002, Taylor-Johnson was commissioned by the National Portrait Gallery to make a video portrait of David Beckham—whom she depicted sleeping. She is perhaps best known for her work entitled 'Crying Men' which features many of Hollywood's glitterati crying, including Robin Williams, Sean Penn, Laurence Fishburne and Paul Newman. In 2006, Taylor-Johnson had a survey exhibition at the BALTIC Centre for Contemporary Art, Gateshead, United Kingdom.

2014 saw a new photographic exhibition by Taylor-Johnson, of the private apartment of Mademoiselle Chanel at The Saatchi Gallery. Entitled ‘Second Floor’, the series of 34 photographs captured the private rooms of Coco Chanel at 31 Rue Cambon in Paris.

Nowhere Boy

In August 2008, Taylor-Johnson was chosen to direct Nowhere Boy, a biopic about the childhood of John Lennon. Speaking about her experience directing the film, in September 2010, Taylor-Johnson said,
"I thought, I'm in too deep and if I mess this up I'm just never gonna make a film again, and I went into a panic. I got into the car and said, I just have to call these producers and pull out. I got into the car and I put the key into the ignition and Lennon's voice came straight out of the radio and it was Starting Over. It was one of those moments where I thought it was a sign: OK I'm gonna do it."

The 53rd annual London Film Festival screened the film as its closing presentation on 29 October 2009. The film was released in the UK on Boxing Day in 2009 to positive reviews. Taylor-Johnson was nominated for a BAFTA award on 21 January 2010, but lost out to Duncan Jones.

Other music, film and television work
In her 2004 film installation "Strings" at White Cube, ballet dancer Ivan Putrov was suspended by a harness above four musicians playing the slow movement from Tchaikovsky's Second String Quartet, filmed in the Crush Bar of the Royal Opera House. In 2006, Taylor-Johnson contributed the short film Death Valley to the British version of Destricted. In 2008, Taylor-Johnson directed a short film Love You More, written by Patrick Marber and produced by Anthony Minghella. The film includes two songs by the Buzzcocks and features a cameo appearance by the band's lead singer Pete Shelley. In February 2009, Taylor-Johnson, collaborating with Sky Arts chose to interpret "Vesti la giubba" from Pagliacci. She commented: "I’m really happy to be involved in such a great project. I think by capturing one of opera's most moving moments in a film short, we have put a modern spin on the aria."

In 2011, she directed the R.E.M. music video "Überlin". The clip starred her then-fiancé Aaron Johnson, who "throws some kung-fu kicks, attempts some pirouettes, prances, punches the air, chicken walks, tries out some bunny impressions, and, at one point, fondles his bottom."

In September 2011, she collaborated with Solange Azagury-Partridge on the short film Daydream. This was aired to support the launch of Azagury-Partridge's new jewellery collection, 24:7. Under the direction of Taylor-Johnson, Liberty Ross plays a beautiful woman in her bedroom, bejewelled by her lover, played by JJ Feild. The original music was composed by Oscar winner Atticus Ross, and the director of photography was BAFTA winner John Mathieson.

Taylor-Johnson directed the film adaptation of E. L. James' best-selling erotic novel, Fifty Shades of Grey, made by Universal Pictures and Focus Features. She was chosen from a list that included Angelina Jolie, Steven Soderbergh, Ryan Murphy, Joe Wright, and Gus Van Sant. Taylor-Johnson was in pole position to direct Fifty Shades Darker (the sequel to Fifty Shades of Grey), but decided to walk away from the much-discussed franchise after she was involved in a number of disagreements with author E.L. James. In June 2017, Taylor-Johnson said that she regretted directing the first film.

In March 2021, Taylor-Johnson was announced to have been attached to direct and produce a biographical drama called Rothko, based on the Rothko case. The film is set to commence production in summer 2021.

In July 2022, it was announced that the feature film Back to Black, a biopic based on the life and career of British singer Amy Winehouse would be directed by Taylor-Johnson. Filming for the project commenced in January 2023 in London.

Personal life

Taylor-Johnson has had cancer twice. In December 1997, at age 30, she was treated for colon cancer. In 2000, she was diagnosed with breast cancer.

She practices yoga and Transcendental Meditation, of which she says, "I wouldn’t be able to survive everything without the meditation that I do. It’s what I think has made me able to cope with the madness."

Taylor-Johnson was appointed Officer of the Order of the British Empire (OBE) in the 2011 Birthday Honours for services to the arts.

Marriages and children
Taylor-Johnson married art dealer and gallerist Jay Jopling in 1997; they had two daughters together, born in April 1997 and 2007, respectively. In September 2008, the couple announced that they were separating amicably after 11 years of marriage.

Taylor-Johnson began a relationship with Nowhere Boy actor Aaron Johnson after meeting on the 2009 set of the film when he was 18 and she was 42. The couple announced their engagement at the film's premiere in October 2009. They married at Babington House, Somerset, on 21 June 2012 and both took the name Taylor-Johnson. The couple have two daughters together, born in 2010 and 2012. They live in Los Angeles, California.

Discography 

Taylor-Johnson has released three songs in collaboration with Pet Shop Boys:

 1999: "Je T'aime... Moi Non Plus" included in compilation book/album We Love You (Candy Records)
 2003: "Love to Love You Baby" under the pseudonym Kiki Kokova (Lucky Kunst)
 2008: "I'm in Love with a German Film Star" (Kompakt)

Filmography 
Short film

Film

Television

References

External links

 
 White Cube biography
 BBC Collective Sam Taylor-Wood video interview about her show Still Lives at Baltic, plus a gallery of images
 Sam Taylor-Wood on artnet
 David Video David Beckham Sleeping Video at Liverpool Walker Gallery

1967 births
Living people
20th-century English women artists
21st-century English women artists
20th-century women photographers
21st-century women photographers
Alumni of Goldsmiths, University of London
British video artists
English contemporary artists
English film directors
English women film directors
English women photographers
Officers of the Order of the British Empire
People from Croydon
Photographers from London
Women video artists
Young British Artists